Mount Aetna may refer to:

Mount Etna, a stratovolcano in Sicily.
Mount Aetna (Colorado), a mountain in Colorado
Mount Aetna, Maryland, a census-designated place in the United States
Mount Aetna, Pennsylvania, an unincorporated community in the United States